Bramblefields is a 2.1 hectare Local Nature Reserve in Cambridge. It is owned and managed by Cambridge City Council.

The site in the middle of a residential area has grassland, scrub and a pond with invertebrates such as frogs and newts. Birds include song thrushes.

Part of the area is inaccessible behind fencing. At the one stage access to the new train station was proposed through here, but this was rejected by the city council in 2013.

There is access from Laxton Way, Long Reach Road, Pippin Drive and Discovery Way.

References

Local Nature Reserves in Cambridgeshire